Ninh Dương Lan Ngọc (born April 4, 1990), short name Lan Ngọc, is a Vietnamese actress. She gained popularity with her lead role in The Floating Lives, for which she won the Best Leading Actress award at the 2010 Kite Awards.

Early life 

Lan Ngọc was born on April 4, 1990, in Ho Chi Minh City, Vietnam. She graduated from the Ho Chi Minh City College of Stage Performance and Cinematics.

Career 

Since 2009, Lan Ngọc started taking a few small roles in music videos and advertising video. In 2010, she played Nương in The Floating Lives. This role helped her win the Best Leading Actress award at the 2010 Kite Awards and the Audience Choice Award for Favourite Actress in a Foreign Film in the 20th Golden Rooster Awards. 

In the following years, Lan Ngọc continued to act in hit films such as The Tailor (film), Tam Cam: The Untold Story, and The Royal Bride.

In 2016, she won her second Best Leading Actress award at the Kite Awards for her role in Jackpot.

Besides acting, she also participates in many other entertainment activities. In 2015, she was the winner of the sixth season of Bước nhảy hoàn vũ, the Vietnamese version of Dancing with the Stars.

Filmography

Films

Television

References

External links 

 
 
 

Vietnamese film actresses
1990 births
Living people